Frederick Richard West (6 February 1799 – 1 May 1862) was a British Tory MP for Denbigh Boroughs and East Grinstead. He was a member of the Canterbury Association.

Early life
West was born in 1799 in Hanover Square, London. He was the third son of the Hon. Frederick West (1767–1852) and Maria Myddleton. He attended Eton and Christ Church, Oxford, from where he left in 1818 without a degree.

Political career
West was an MP for Denbigh Boroughs from 1826 to 1830, for East Grinstead from 1830 to 1832, and again Denbigh Boroughs again  from 1847 to 1857. He was a member of the Canterbury Association from 7 May 1850.

Family
His first marriage was on 14 November 1820 to Lady Georgiana Stanhope. Her parents were Philip Stanhope, 5th Earl of Chesterfield (1755–1815) and Henrietta, the third daughter of Thomas Thynne, 1st Marquess of Bath. His second marriage was on 11 September 1827 to Theresa Cornwallis Whitby, the only daughter of Captain John Whitby RN, and Mary Anna Theresa Symonds, had children:
a son (September 1828 – December 1828)
Frederick Myddelton West (31 August 1830 – 13 August 1868)
Georgiana Theresa Ella West (28 December 1831 – ?), married to Warren Peacocke (1822–1877), son of Vice-Admiral Richard Peacocke.
Florence West (2 November 1833 – 1 June 1906)
William Cornwallis-West (20 March 1835 – 4 July 1917), who later became an MP for West Denbighshire
Theresa Lucy Sophia Elphinstone West (9 August 1839 – ?)

References

External links
 

1799 births
1862 deaths
Frederick Richard West
Frederick Richard
Members of the Canterbury Association
Members of the Parliament of the United Kingdom for English constituencies
UK MPs 1826–1830
UK MPs 1830–1831
UK MPs 1831–1832
UK MPs 1847–1852
UK MPs 1852–1857
Conservative Party (UK) MPs for Welsh constituencies
People educated at Eton College
Alumni of Christ Church, Oxford
Tory MPs (pre-1834)